The 1929 NCAA baseball season, play of college baseball in the United States organized by the National Collegiate Athletic Association (NCAA) began in the spring of 1929.  Play largely consisted of regional matchups, some organized by conferences, and ended in June.  No national championship event was held until 1947.

Conference changes
The Missouri Valley split into the Big Six and Missouri Valley Conference.  Iowa State, Kansas, Missouri, Nebraska, and Oklahoma formed the Big Six, while Drake, Grinnell, Oklahoma A&M, and Washington (St. Louis) formed the Missouri Valley.

Conference winners
This is a partial list of conference champions from the 1924 season.

References